Francis Roy Plomley,  (20 January 1914 – 28 May 1985) was an English radio broadcaster, producer, playwright and novelist. He is best remembered for devising the BBC Radio series Desert Island Discs, which he hosted from its inception in 1942 until his death.

Early life
Plomley was born in Kingston upon Thames, Surrey, the only surviving child of pharmaceutical chemist Francis John Plomley (1868–1942) and Ellinor Maud (1880–1968; née Wigg). He was educated at King's College School, Wimbledon. On leaving school he worked first briefly for an estate agent, then for a London advertising agency, and then in publishing.

His original aim was to be an actor, and he did secure very minor parts in a number of films, e.g. To the Public Danger (1948), Double Confession (1950), but he soon drifted into broadcasting, coming to public notice as an announcer, and later producer, for the International Broadcasting Company (IBC), starting on Radio Normandy in April 1936 and moving on at the end of that year to the IBC's Paris-based station, Poste Parisien.

Between mid-1937 and late 1939 he was involved in writing and production, travelling back and forth between these two IBC stations in France and the company's offices and studios in London, while also presenting the variety programme Radio Normandy Calling, recorded on location in theatres at UK seaside resorts and regularly beating the BBC in audience ratings.

World War II
This part of his career came to an abrupt end when commercial broadcasting from the continent was brought to a halt by World War II. Plomley and his new wife stayed on in Paris, only narrowly escaping back to the UK via a circuitous route through the chaos and panic of the Fall of France, losing all their possessions in the process, as German occupying forces approached the French capital in June 1940.

Desert Island Discs
In 1941, he devised the BBC Radio series Desert Island Discs.
It was created on a cold November evening while Plomley was contemplating ideas and deciding whether to retire to bed or not. In the cottage (now replaced) he was living in at the time at Little Bushey Lane, Bushey, Hertfordshire, he wrote to Leslie Perowne, who was in charge of popular record programmes. He had a favourable reply and so, in his little back bedroom/study he set out his ideas with the names of personalities to be invited to participate. In those days of WWII every BBC Radio show was scripted by Plomley and submitted for censorship.

In January 1942 the first of a series of eight weekly programmes was broadcast. Each show consisted of an interview with a celebrity, interspersed by the guest's choice of music. His contract was renewed for a further 15 shows. In the end he presented 1,791 editions of the programme stretching over 43 years. Its success was attributed to his skill as an interviewer and to his meticulous research.

Plomley was succeeded as presenter by Michael Parkinson (1985–1988), then by Sue Lawley (1988–2006), Kirsty Young (2006—2018) and most recently by Lauren Laverne. Desert Island Discs is the second longest-running radio programme in the world (after the Grand Ole Opry), and it is still running.

Until late September 2009, unlike many other BBC radio programmes, Desert Island Discs was unavailable for Listen Again on the BBC website. This was because, when Roy Plomley devised the programme, he was a freelance producer, and it had been argued therefore, that the 'format rights' of the programme belonged to him rather than to the BBC. At his death, those 'rights' passed to his widow, and the BBC were subsequently unable to negotiate the right to include Desert Island Discs in their Listen Again offering. It was announced on 27 September 2009 that an agreement had been reached with the family as to payment of royalties and it would be available via iPlayer.

Other work

Plomley's broadcasting career was not restricted to Desert Island Discs; he also compiled and presented several feature programmes and was the chairman of BBC Radio's game show Many a Slip from 1964 to 1979, and a participant in such panel games as Does the Team Think?, also on BBC Radio. He also anchored Round Britain Quiz in 1961. For television he produced Dinner Date with Death in 1949, claimed to be the first UK film made for TV, and in the same year chaired We Beg to Differ on BBC Radio, transferring with it to BBC Television in 1951.

He wrote the screenplay for the 1953 film The Blakes Slept Here and a number of plays including 'The First Time I Saw Paris', 'Moonlight Behind You', 'The Lively Oracles' (with John Allegro) and the comedies 'Round the Mulberry Bush', 'Everybody's Making Money - Except Shakespeare', 'Salad Days', 'The Galleon in the Garden', and 'Half Seas Over'.

Plomley was appointed OBE in 1975. He was Chairman of the Radio and Television Writers' Association from 1957 to 1959, and was voted BBC Radio Personality of the Year in 1979. He published 16 stage plays (one of which, Cold Turkey, was put on in the West End), and one novel. He was posthumously inducted into the Radio Academy's Hall of Fame.

Plomley died in London from pleurisy in 1985 aged 71 and is buried at Putney Vale Cemetery.

References

External links
 
 A rare recording of Roy Plomley in his pre-war Radio Normandy days may be heard at the website Paul's Radio Museum Paul's Radio Museum - How Radio Used To Sound.
 Roy Plomley at the Radio Academy – includes some audio clips from Desert Island Discs and other BBC programmes The Radio Academy.

1914 births
1985 deaths
People educated at King's College School, London
British radio personalities
Burials at Putney Vale Cemetery
Officers of the Order of the British Empire